Zoltán Antal (born December 8, 1971) is a Hungarian sprint canoer who competed in the mid-to-late 1990s. He won two medals at the ICF Canoe Sprint World Championships with a silver (K-4 1000 m: 1997) and a bronze (K-4 500 m: 1994).

Antal also competed in the K-1 500 m event at the 1996 Summer Olympics in Atlanta, but was eliminated in the semifinals.

References

Sports-reference.com profile

1971 births
Canoeists at the 1996 Summer Olympics
Hungarian male canoeists
Living people
Olympic canoeists of Hungary
ICF Canoe Sprint World Championships medalists in kayak
20th-century Hungarian people